Parliamentary elections were held in Iceland on 24 June 1956. The Independence Party remained the largest party in the Lower House of the Althing, winning 13 of the 35 seats.

Electoral system 
The elections were conducted under two electoral systems. Twenty-one members were elected in single-member constituencies via first-past-the-post voting, while the remainder were elected using D'Hondt method proportional representation: twelve members in two-member constituencies, eight members in Reykjavík, and eleven from a single national compensatory list. To earn national list seats, a party had to win at least one constituency seat. In constituencies electing two or more members, within the party list, voters had the option to re-rank the candidates and could also strike a candidate out. Allocation of seats to candidates was done using a system based on the Borda count.

Results

References

Iceland
Parliament
Elections in Iceland
Parliamentary elections in Iceland
Iceland